Samuel Anderson Nicholl (April 20, 1869 – April 19, 1937) was an Irish-born Major League Baseball player. He played for the Pittsburgh Alleghenys of the National League during the 1888 baseball season and the Columbus Solons of the American Association during the 1890 season.

External links 

1869 births
1937 deaths
Major League Baseball outfielders
Pittsburgh Alleghenys players
Columbus Solons players
19th-century baseball players
Major League Baseball players from Ireland
Irish emigrants to the United States (before 1923)
Irish baseball players
Wheeling National Citys players
Davenport Hawkeyes players
Saginaw-Bay City Hyphens players
Lincoln Rustlers players
Des Moines Prohibitionists players
Toledo Black Pirates players
Savannah Electrics players
Kansas City Cowboys (minor league) players
Kansas City Blues (baseball) players
Detroit Tigers (Western League) players
St. Paul Saints (Western League) players
Indianapolis Hoosiers (minor league) players
Sportspeople from County Antrim